Pickering is a market town and civil parish in the Ryedale district in North Yorkshire, England, on the border of the North York Moors National Park. Historically part of the North Riding of Yorkshire, it is at the foot of the moors, overlooking the Vale of Pickering to the south.

Pickering Parish Church, with its medieval wall paintings, Pickering Castle, the North Yorkshire Moors Railway and Beck Isle Museum have made Pickering popular with visitors. Nearby places include Malton, Norton-on-Derwent and Scarborough.

History
Positioned on the shores of a glacial lake at the end of the last ice age, Pickering was in an ideal place for early settlers to benefit from the multiple natural resources of the moorlands to the north, the wetlands to the south, running water in the beck and the forests all around. It had wood, stone, wildfowl, game, fish, fresh water and fertile easily worked soils. The east–west route from the coast passed along the foothills of the North York Moors through the site at a place where the beck could be forded.
There is evidence of Celtic and Roman era habitation in the areas surrounding Pickering but little remains in the town. Legendary sources suggest an early date for the establishment of a town but traces of earlier settlements have been erased by subsequent development.

The town probably existed throughout the Anglo-Saxon period of British history. According to the Domesday Book there was enough arable land for 27 ploughs, meadows and extensive woodlands. The town may have grown up to service the Norman castle.

After the conquest

After 1066 when William I became the King, the town and its neighbourhood were in the possession of the crown. A castle and church were built at this time and the medieval kings occasionally visited the area. After the Harrying of the North by the Normans, the value of the village fell from £88 to £1. In 1267 the manor, castle and forest of Pickering were given by Henry III to his youngest son, Edmund, First Earl of Lancaster.  The estate was confiscated by the King and then returned. Eventually, it passed to Henry, Duke of Lancaster who became King Henry IV of England. It has belonged to the monarch ever since.

In 1598 the streets of Pickering were: East Gate, Hall Garth, Hungate, Birdgate, Borrowgate (the present Burgate) and West Gate.

Many older small houses were built at this time, some of stone with thatched roofs. The stocks, shambles and the market cross stood in the centre of town in the Market Place. The castle fell into disrepair yet the town flourished. In the English Civil War, Parliamentary soldiers were quartered in the town and damaged the church and castle and Pickering was the location of a minor skirmish but not a pitched battle.

In the 1650s George Fox, the founder of Society of Friends, or Quakers, visited the town to preach on at least two occasions.

Nicholas Postgate, the Catholic martyr, lived for a time in Pickering. He was hanged, drawn and quartered in York in 1679.

Early Modern
Pickering prospered as a market town and agricultural centre. It had watermills and several inns and was a centre for mail coach traffic and trade. At this time the beck was an open sewer and it remained so until the early part of the 20th century.

Many townspeople adoptioned Non-conformist religious sects and were visited by John Wesley on several occasions, the first in 1764 and the last in 1790. The Quakers held meetings in a cottage long before they built their Meeting House in Castlegate in 1793. In 1789 the first Congregational Church was built in Hungate and for several years following 1793 a private residence was licensed for divine worship by protestant dissenters. The Pickering Methodist Circuit was formed in 1812.

19th century
Non-conformism flourished in Pickering during the 19th century and meeting houses and chapels were enlarged. There were both Wesleyan and Anglican schools in the town from the middle of the century.

The Whitby and Pickering Railway was opened in May 1836. At first the carriages and wagons were horse drawn but steam locomotives were used from 1847. The Forge Valley Line ran from 1882 to 1950, connecting Pickering to the Whitby–Scarborough line.
The local Health Board (the forerunner of the Urban District Council) was formed in 1863. A Gas and Water Company provided gaslight and piped drinking water. The shop fronts were closed in and glass windows were used to display goods for sale.

20th century
At the 1901 census, Pickering had 3,491 people and by 1911 this had risen to 3,674 who were living in 784 households. There were more than 60 shops. In the early 20th century the growth of non-conformist religious sects, particularly Methodism, generated a political spirit of Liberalism and Pickering built a great Liberal tradition.

In 1901 the Catholic priest Fr Edward Bryan came to the town and established a school, parish and, in 1911, St Joseph's Church, the work of the architect Leonard Stokes. It contains a font by the celebrated sculptor Eric Gill.

In 1922 an old mill was converted to the Memorial Hall in memory of the Pickering men killed in the First World War. This hall, now modernised, serves as a community centre. The Castle Cinema was built in 1937 in Burgate. Electricity had arrived a few years earlier.

The years from 1920 to 1950 saw a decline in Pickering's role as an agricultural market town and the population fell from a peak of 4,193 in 1951 to 4,186 in 1961. The closure of the railway in 1965 under the Beeching axe was a blow to the area. 

The economy of the town saw a turn around in the following decades with the greater mobility of the working population and a rise in tourism due to increasing car ownership. Tourism is a major occupation since the reopening of the North Yorkshire Moors Railway as a restored steam railway and the filming of the television series Heartbeat on the moors. In 1991 the population was 6,269.

Landmarks

Pickering Parish Church is at the eastern end of the Market Place and dominates views of Pickering from all directions. It is a Grade I Listed building that dates from the 12th century. It is notable for its mid-15th-century wall paintings, which cover the north and south walls. The wall paintings were covered over at the Reformation, but rediscovered in 1852. They were painted over once more, but were restored in the 1870s. The church is open every day. North of the church at the top of the hill is Pickering Castle, which was built in the late 11th century to defend the area against the Scots and Danes. The sloping Market Place between the church and the beck is lined with two- and three-storey buildings dating from a variety of periods. Most are listed for their historical or architectural interest. This area is the centre of the town's main Conservation Area.

Governance
The Member of the UK Parliament is Kevin Hollinrake (Conservative).

Until the 2010 general election Pickering was in the Ryedale constituency but due to boundary changes was moved to the new Thirsk and Malton constituency.

There are 2 electoral wards in Pickering (east and west). Their cumulative population is equal to that listed for the Town.

Pickering is one of the few places with Liberal Party councillors, on Ryedale District Council where they are the second largest party, and on North Yorkshire County Council.

Geography

Situation

Pickering is situated at the junction of the A170, which links Scarborough with Thirsk, and the A169 linking Malton and Whitby. It occupies a broad strip of land between the Ings and Low Carrs to the south of the main road and a ridge of higher, sloping ground which is surmounted by the castle to the north. It is sited where the older limestone and sandstone rocks of the North York Moors meet the glacial deposits of the Vale of Pickering. The limestone rocks form the hill on which the higher parts of the town and the castle are situated. Pickering Beck is a watercourse that runs north to south through the centre of the town. It rises on the moors and drains southwards through Newton Dale before reaching Pickering. It is prone to flooding at times of exceptional rainfall when areas of town close to the beck become flooded. The town centre lies east of the beck, though the population is almost equally divided between its east and west wards. Pickering has developed around the old Market Place but the majority of houses are now in the residential estates off the main A170 road.

Physical geography
It is dissected by a series of south-flowing streams which include Pickering Beck. Most of the moorland consists of Jurassic sandstone with occasional cappings of gritstone on the highest hills.

To the south these rocks are overlaid with oolitic limestone which forms flat-topped tabular hills with an escarpment to the north and gentler slopes to the south. Ice action in the last glaciation deepened pre-existing valleys, and determined the line of the rivers and streams. Newtondale to the north of Pickering was cut by meltwater from ice in Eskdale gouging a deep channel as it flowed southwards to the lake which filled the Vale of Pickering. This lake was blocked by ice and glacial deposits near the coast so it drained through the Kirkham Gorge towards the River Ouse. South of Pickering, extensive marshes have been drained and exploited as fertile agricultural land.

Climate 
Located in the northern part of the UK, Pickering has a temperate maritime climate which is dominated by the passage of mid-latitude depressions. The weather is very changeable from day to day and the warming influence of the Gulf Stream makes the region mild for its latitude. The average total annual rainfall is 729 mm with rain falling on 128 days of the year. January is usually the coldest month and December the wettest. The warmest month is August and the driest is February.

Flooding

Pickering Beck has a history of flooding, which occurs on average every five years. However, out-of-bank flows are experienced on some sections of the watercourse annually. These areas include Potter Hill and the grassed area upstream of Pickering Bridge. The flood in March 1999 caused widespread damage to the town.
Areas affected were Park Street, Beck Isle, Bridge Street, Potter Hill, The Ropery, Hungate, Vivis Walk and Undercliff. Flooding in 2006 caused extensive damage to properties in the Market Place as well as the above areas.

Since 2007, Pickering has planted trees and built 167 retaining dams above the town to keep back water.

Demography
According to the United Kingdom Census 2001 Pickering had a population of 6,846 people in 3,071 households. There were 3,213 males and 3,633 females. The mean age of the population for the East Ward was 45.30 years and for the West Ward it was 43.47 years. Both of these ages are significantly higher than the national mean age of 38.6 years. In the census year 25.39% of Pickering's population was over 65 years compared with 15.89% nationally. There were 1,183 people below the age of 16 and 886 over the age of 75. The census for 2011 only showed a marginal difference in population at 6,830.

Economy
Pickering has two main shopping areas, Market Place, which is by far the larger, and Eastgate Square, which is a mixed housing and retail development. There is a small supermarket off the Market Place.
 
There are few large employers in the town. Most people find jobs in retailing, tourism and small industries based in the two industrial development areas at Westgate Carr Road and Thornton Road to the west and east of the town respectively.

Pickering is an important tourist centre and there are banking, insurance and legal services in the town as well as an outdoor market each Monday. In 2008, plans were put forward to build a new supermarket in the area of an old coal yard, and a Lidl supermarket has now been built on the site.

Natural gas industry 
A natural gas processing facility was formerly located in Pickering. The Lockton natural gas field was discovered under the North York Moors National Park by the Home Oil Company of Canada in 1966. It is located at a depth of 5,700 ft (1,740 m) in Middle Magnesian Limestone. The gas is about 94% methane, 3% inert gas with traces of hydrogen sulphide. Recoverable reserves were initially estimated to be 250 billion cubic feet (7 billion m3). In an agreement between the Gas Council and Home Oil/Gas Council Exploration provision was to have been made to use the Lockton gas field for the seasonal storage of natural gas.

Facilities 
To minimise development within the national park area only the gas wells, a field gathering station and underground pipelines were located in the Park. Gas from the gathering station was piped at 1,075 psi (74 bar) via an 18-inch (460 mm) diameter underground pipeline nine miles (14.5 km) to a treatment plant in Outgang Lane on the outskirts of Pickering. Construction of the plant at Pickering started in May 1969 and was operational by August 1971. The total cost of the facilities was £4–£8 million. It employed about 24 people.

Operation 
Hot water from the treatment plant was circulated in small-bore pipes alongside the pipeline to reduce heat losses and potential hydrate formation, an ice-like substance that can cause blockages. At the Pickering treatment plant raw gas was routed through a slug catcher and inlet separator to remove liquid hydrocarbons and water. Gas flowed to two parallel vetrocoke absorbers where it was washed with a counter-current aqueous solution of soda ash and arsenic compounds to convert the hydrogen sulphide to elemental sulphur. Gas then flowed to a hydrocarbon recovery unit where it was chilled to remove further liquid hydrocarbons, the dry sulphur-free gas passed through a British Gas metering station to Feeder No. 6 of the National Transmission System which passes through Pickering. The sulphur-rich solution from the absorbers was routed to oxidiser regenerators where air was bubbled through the solution to remove the sulphur in the form of a froth. The froth was dried in a rotary vacuum filter and heated in an autoclave to allow removal of impurities prior to being stored in tanks at about 130 °C from where it was removed by heated road tanker. The regenerated absorber solution from the oxidisers, together with recovered solution from the vacuum filters, was returned for reuse in the vetrocoke absorbers. Hydrocarbon liquids were routed to condensate stabilizers and then to storage tanks for removal by road tanker.

Gas production and closure 
The production and gas treatment facility was permanently shut down in October 1974. Over three years it had produced  at standard conditions, only 4.5% of the estimated recoverable reserves.

Gas field redevelopment 
The Lockton gas field is now known as Ebberston Moor. It is licensed to Third Energy. In 2014 Third Energy announced a joint venture with Moorland Energy Limited (MEL) to develop the Ebberston Moor South development. Gas from the existing Ebberston Moor South well will be transported via a new 14-km pipeline to the Knapton Generating Station.

Culture, media and sport
There are three theatre venues in the town offering a very wide range of amateur and professional productions. In July the annual Jazz Festival is held in Pickering.

There is a leisure centre, a swimming pool and a modern library and information centre. Sports activities include athletics, football, cricket, badminton and bowls. Pickering is home to Pickering Town F.C., who currently play in Division One North-West of the Northern Premier League, Level 8 of the football league pyramid.

Notable sports-people from the town include, footballing brothers Craig Short and Chris Short, and snooker player Paul Davison.

Local newspapers are
Ryedale Mercury (weekly)
The Scarborough News (weekly)
Evening Press (daily)
Gazette and Herald, (Ryedale) (weekly)

Notable residents of Pickering have included Dorothy Cowlin who wrote many articles about the area and its people.

Places of interest in and around Pickering

Beck Isle Museum

The Beck Isle Museum is housed in a Regency period residence near the centre of town, adjacent to the Pickering Beck, a stream that flows under a four-arched road bridge. It was here that William Marshall planned England's first Agricultural Institute in the early 19th century. The house contains a collection of bygones relating to the rural crafts and living style of Ryedale. The collection is not restricted to a particular period, but aims to reflect local life and customs and trace the developments in social and domestic life during the last 200 years. A selection of photographs from the Sidney Smith collection held in the museum are displayed around the building, particularly in the photography and model rooms. Sidney Smith was born in Pickering. He is thought of as a successor to Frank Meadow Sutcliffe of Whitby. The museum is owned by the Beck Isle Museum Trust and is staffed and operated by volunteers.

Dalby Forest

Dalby Forest is on the southern slopes of the North York Moors National Park. The southern part of the forest is divided by valleys creating a 'Rigg and Dale' landscape whilst to the north, the forest sits on the upland plateau. Although the forest is mostly pine and spruce, there are many broadleaf trees such as oak, beech, ash, alder and hazel in the valleys and on the 'Riggs'. Clear streams arising as springs run north and south out of the forest which is home to the crossbill and the nightjar. Roe deer abound and badgers, the symbol of the forest, are a common but nocturnal resident. The signs of the past are evidenced in burial mounds, linear earthworks of unknown purpose and the remains of a rabbit warrening industry can be found in the wood. A network of forest roads including the  Dalby Forest Drive provide access. The landscape was formed in the last ice age and shaped by the people of the Bronze Age to the present day.

North York Moors National Park

The national park authority works to promote enjoyment and encourage understanding of the area by the public and balance it with conservation. This includes producing information and interpretation, managing public rights of way and access areas, car parks and toilets and having a Ranger Service.

North Yorkshire Moors Railway

The North Yorkshire Moors Railway is a heritage railway. The  line is the second-longest heritage line in the United Kingdom and runs across the moors from Pickering via Levisham, Newton Dale and Goathland to Grosmont. It is run by the North York Moors Historical Railway Trust and operated and staffed by volunteers.
Pickering station has been its terminus since 1965 when the Malton-Pickering route connecting to the York to Scarborough main line was closed. Before the station became a terminus, the double-track railway took up the space now occupied by The Ropery (a road) and the car park to the east. Trains run daily from mid-March to early November and on selected dates through the winter. Trains are mostly steam-hauled; however in some cases heritage diesel engine is used. At the height of the running timetable, trains depart hourly from each station. During the summer months, steam services extend to the seaside town of Whitby. Passenger numbers have topped 350,000 in recent years.

Pickering Castle

Pickering Castle is situated at the edge of the moors. It is a classic, well-preserved example of an early motte and bailey castle refortified in stone during the 13th and 14th centuries, centred upon a shell keep crowning an impressive motte. There is an exhibition in the chapel.

Pickering Church

Pickering Church has a Saxon foundation, but the earliest phases of the present building date to the 12th and 13th centuries, with substantial additions in the 14th and 15th. In 1852 restoration work revealed a series of wall paintings on the north and south walls of the nave. Despite a local and national outcry, the paintings were whitewashed, and only rediscovered and restored in 1876–78. They have been called "the most complete collection of medieval wall paintings in England".

Saint Joseph's Church

Saint Joseph's Roman Catholic Church, on Potter Hill, was designed by the architect Leonard Stokes in 1911, on the instructions of the parish priest, Fr Edward Bryan. It contains a stone font by the sculptor Eric Gill, and the portable altar-stone of the 17th-century martyr Blessed Nicholas Postgate; also a fine icon, painted in Rome, of Our Lady of Perpetual Succour, and a mosaic of Christ blessing the loaves and fishes by local artist Audrey Murty. Outside the church is a statue of Saint Joseph designed by Peter Paul Pugin, son of Augustus Welby Pugin. The church features in the book A Glimpse of Heaven by Christopher Martin (English Heritage 2006).

Events

Pickering is host to a War Weekend, which includes parades and soup kitchens. There is also a theatre named Kirk Theatre, which is a popular tourist attraction.

Transport

Bus services operated by Yorkshire Coastliner connect to York via Malton, Whitby and Thirsk. The 128 bus route connects to Scarborough and Helmsley, and is operated by East Yorkshire.
There is a town bus which travels a circular route around the town.

Plans to reopen the Pickering–Rillington Junction railway line (connecting to the Scarborough line near Rillington village) have surfaced multiple times but rail reopenings in England are exceptional, and no funds have been secured to rebuild it. If rebuilt, the line would cost £21 million despite being just six miles long. The track does not follow the same corridor as the A169 road. A monorail has been suggested as a cheaper alternative, but this would prevent interoperability of through services from York and Malton to Pickering and Whitby.

Education

Adult and community
Askham Bryan College, Swainsea Lane was closed in 2008.

Pre-school
Parish Hall Toddler and Playgroup
Methodist Hall Toddler and Playgroup
St Joseph's Catholic Primary School from 3 years old
Humpty Dumpty Nursery, Firthlands Road

Primary schools
Pickering Community Infant School, Ruffa Lane
Pickering Community Junior School, Middleton Road
St Josephs Roman Catholic Primary School, Swainsea Lane.

Secondary school
Lady Lumley's School, Swainsea Lane

References

Sources

External links

Pickering Parish Church Home to the Famous 15th century Wall Paintings
, a history of Pickering since pre-historic times, by Gordon Home.
Pickering Town Guide (Needs Adobe Acrobat.)
Pickering Town Council

 
Towns in North Yorkshire
Market towns in North Yorkshire
Civil parishes in North Yorkshire
Ryedale